The 1983 NCAA Skiing Championships were contested at the Bridger Bowl Ski Area in Bozeman, Montana as part of the 30th annual NCAA-sanctioned ski tournament to determine the individual and team national champions of men's and women's collegiate slalom skiing and cross-country skiing in the United States.

These were the first championships with teams composed of both men's and women's skiers.

Utah, coached by Phil Miller, claimed their second team national championship, 46 points ahead of Vermont in the cumulative team standings.

Venue

This year's NCAA skiing championships were hosted at the Bridger Bowl Ski Area near Bozeman, Montana.

These were the second championships held in the state of Montana (1960 and 1983).

Program
Four new events were added this year:
 Women's slalom
 Women's giant slalom
 Women's cross country
 Women's cross country relay

Team scoring

See also
List of NCAA skiing programs

References

1983 in sports in Montana
NCAA Skiing Championships
NCAA Skiing Championships
1983 in alpine skiing
1983 in cross-country skiing